Herb Trawick (February 22, 1921 – September 16, 1985) was a professional Canadian football player and was the first African American to play professional Canadian football. Trawick spent his entire 12-year career as an offensive lineman and defensive guard with the Montreal Alouettes.

College career and military service
Trawick attended Kentucky State College for Negroes and graduated with a degree in physical education. He was a three-time All-American in football, from 1940 to 1942. After school he enlisted in the U.S. Army during World War II.

Professional career
Lew Hayman and Leo Dandurand were managing the new Montreal Alouettes franchise in 1946, and they did not fail to notice how popular and well-received the first black baseball player in the pros, Jackie Robinson (when he played minor league ball with the Montreal Royals), was. They were determined to have a black player on their team.

Trawick was not their first choice, but he was the best. When he retired in 1957, Trawick was the only "original" Alouette remaining with the team.

He also played in 4 Grey Cup games, scoring a touchdown on a fumble recovery in the Als 1949 Grey Cup championship win against the Calgary Stampeders. Trawick played in the three-game Grey Cup set against the Edmonton Eskimos from 1954 to 1956, and had a touchdown on a fumble return called back in the classic 42nd Grey Cup game.

Though he was welcomed in Montreal and made it his home, things were not perfect. Though university educated, he could only find work as a doorman. He became a Canadian citizen in 1953. He was noted for his generous community charity work.

Awards and honours
Much loved by his fans, Trawick's jersey No. 56 is one of seven retired by the Alouettes.  Trawick was elected to the Canadian Football Hall of Fame and the Kentucky State University Athletics Hall of Fame in 1975.

Trawick died on September 16, 1985, in his adopted home town of Montreal. On July 16, 1997, a park was named in his honour by the City of Montreal.  Parc Herb-Trawick is situated southwest of the intersection of Lionel-Groulx Avenue and Richmond Street.

In 2006, Trawick was voted to the Honour Roll of the Canadian Football League's Top 50 players of the sport's modern era by Canadian sports network TSN.

References

1921 births
1985 deaths
African-American players of Canadian football
American emigrants to Canada
United States Army personnel of World War II
American players of Canadian football
Canadian football defensive linemen
Canadian Football Hall of Fame inductees
Canadian football offensive linemen
Kentucky State Thorobreds football players
Montreal Alouettes players
Players of American football from Pittsburgh
Players of Canadian football from Pittsburgh
Canadian football people from Montreal
United States Army soldiers
20th-century African-American sportspeople